Namphan, also known as Na-hpan, is the capital town of Namphan Township, Shan State. It is part of the Wa Self-Administered Division.

Geography
Namphan is located in a small valley east of the Salween, about 28 km from the border with China.

Further reading
 Myanmar States/Divisions & Townships Overview Map

References

Populated places in Shan State
Township capitals of Myanmar